Üçbulaq is a village in the Fuzuli District of Azerbaijan.

History 
The village was located in the Armenian-occupied territories surrounding Nagorno-Karabakh, coming under the control of ethnic Armenian forces during the First Nagorno-Karabakh War. The village subsequently became part of the breakaway Republic of Artsakh as part of its Hadrut Province, referred to as Hogher. It came under the control of Azerbaijan during the 2020 Nagorno-Karabakh war.

Notable people 
 Elkhan Zulfugarov — National Hero of Azerbaijan.

References

External links 
 

Populated places in Fuzuli District